Fountainville may refer to the following places in the United States:

Fountainville, Georgia, unincorporated community in Macon County
Fountainville, Pennsylvania, unincorporated community in Bucks County